Kirk Duncan Matthew Humphrey (born St. Michael South, Barbados) is a Barbadian politician and government minister of Barbados. He is the Minister of People Empowerment and Elder Affairs as appointed by President Dame Sandra Mason.

Early life and career 
Humphrey was born in Saint Michael, Barbados. Kirk Humphrey has two master's degrees from London School of Economics in Social Policy and Planning for Developing Countries. He obtained his second degree from Harvard Kennedy School with a focus on "Public Policy and Leadership" and "Leadership and Human Rights".

In the 2018 Barbadian general election he was elected member of parliament representing Saint Michael South under the Barbados Labour Party defeating Prime Minister Freundel Stuart. He was subsequently appointed Minister of Maritime Affairs and the Blue Economy, in the Mia Mottley Administration.

On February 3, 2022, he was appointed Minister of People Empowerment and Elder Affairs by President Dame Sandra Mason.

References 

Living people
Barbadian politicians
Barbados Labour Party politicians
Alumni of the London School of Economics
Harvard Kennedy School alumni
Year of birth missing (living people)